Kempten University of Applied Sciences (abbr. Kempten UAS, in German: Hochschule für angewandte Wissenschaften Kempten) is a university of applied sciences in Kempten (Allgäu), Germany. The Bavarian State Parliament passed the law founding it on 27 June 1977. The official opening ceremony was held on 4 October 1978. Kempten University of Applied Sciences is the central facility in the Allgäu region for academic teaching, professional development, and the transfer of technology and knowledge. The university aims to provide practically focused, innovative training for specialist workers and managers. Most of the university’s buildings are on its campus on Bahnhofstrasse. The main lecture hall can seat an audience of approx. 350.

History 
Kempten town council and representatives of local industry first sought to found an Alpine university in 1969 – specifically, a higher technical college from 1972. The Bavarian Council of Ministers granted Kempten a higher technical college in 1975. Two years later, the Bavarian State Parliament passed a law founding Kempten Higher Technical College, at the time aiming for 1,000 students. 

The very first semester of the degree programme in Business Administration started on 2 October 1978 in rented premises on Bahnhofstrasse. The opening ceremony was conducted by the Bavarian Culture Minister Hans Maier in the Princes’ Hall inside the Prince Abbot’s Residence on 4 October 1978. Hanns Ott became the inaugural President on 1 February 1978. 

In 1980, the Free State of Bavaria purchased a plot of land approx. 42,000 m² on Bahnhofstrasse (previously Alfred Kunz construction company). The university’s managers and administration moved temporarily into premises on Immenstädter Strasse that same year. The competition for tenders to design the first teaching buildings was won by Heid/Thumann/Frese architects’ office, based in Fürth. 

The degree programme in Mechanical Engineering was launched in 1982, the same year that the first cohort of students graduated in Business Administration. In 1983, the need for more space led the higher technical college to rent additional rooms in 4P-Haus on Kronenstrasse in the historical town centre. Students protested for their own cafeteria in 1984, which the Studentenwerk opened in 1985. 

In 1986, a machinery hall was constructed for the higher technical college. The lecture theatre and laboratory building for Technology was completed in 1989. Work on the lecture theatre building for Business commenced in 1990. In 1992, the number of students increased from 1,000 to 1,450. Business studies moved into their new premises. The library and the canteen were relocated into a new building 1994. In 1995, Kempten UAS along with Rosenheim UAS became “model higher technical colleges”. 

Further fields of study and faculties were added to Kempten UAS from 1996 on. The ongoing increase in student numbers called for continual expansion of the teaching buildings. In 1997, building commenced on an extension for Business studies, and in 1998 a plot of land was acquired close to campus. The degree programme in Computer Science was launched in 2000. The following year, the degree programme in Electrical Engineering and Information Technology replaced the previous programme in Electrical Engineering. 

Social Sector Management was added as a field of study in 2003. The IVth construction phase, encompassing administrative rooms and a main lecture hall to accommodate 350 people, commenced in 2004. Kempten UAS has operated on a fully integrated site since then. 

On 30 March 2007, the higher technical college was renamed to reflect its status as a University of Applied Sciences (“Hochschule für angewandte Wissenschaften”). The degree programmes in Business Administration, Tourism and Computer Science were turned into bachelor’s qualifications that same year, and the expansion programme for Bavarian universities of applied sciences allocated Kempten an additional 1,254 places on degree programmes. The Vth construction phase commenced shortly thereafter on the plot of land procured in 1998. 

Degree programmes in Energy and Environmental Engineering and in Business Information Systems were launched in 2008. In 2010, an annexe was added to the building housing the library and canteen. That same year, three new master’s degree programmes (Electrical Engineering, Global Business Development, and Logistics) and two new undergraduate degree programmes (Food and Packaging Technology and Mechatronics) were launched. 

In 2009, Kempten University of Applied Sciences joined forces with its counterparts in Neu-Ulm and Augsburg to found the Castle Vöhlin Higher Education Hub in Illertissen. The three universities use this facility for seminars, professional training, conferences and advising new entrepreneurs.

As part of the Bavarian-Swabian “Digital and Regional” study format instigated by Kempten, Augsburg and Neu-Ulm universities of applied sciences, a higher education hub was set up in Memmingen for the degree programme in Systems Engineering, which was launched in Winter Semester 2016/2017 and can be studied part-time, full-time or intensively.

On 1 March 2011, a new (rented) building on campus called the Denkfabrik was placed under university administration. On 5 July 2011, the Vth construction phase was inaugurated. 

It was also in 2011 that Tourism was separated from Business Administration to form its own faculty, henceforth housed in the Denkfabrik (Building A) and renamed Faculty of Tourism Management in 2018.

Departments and Faculties
Kempten University Of Applied Sciences levies the fee of 92 euros per semester known as the Semesterbeitrag. A further 30 euros are payable for the semester ticket. 

The academic faculties are as follows: 

 Business Administration
 Electrical Engineering
 Computer Science
 Mechanical Engineering
 Social and Health Studies
 Tourism Management
 Professional Development (Kempten Business School)

Consortium and partnerships

The university is a member of the university consortium Lake Constance Arts & Sciences Association. It also participates in the Partner Universities for Sporting Excellence scheme, which helps top athletes to combine sporting careers with academic studies. 

Students can choose from various options at more than 110 partner universities abroad to study anything from individual modules right through to gaining a double degree.

Forschungszentrum Allgäu (FZA) – Allgäu Research Centre 
Forschungszentrum Allgäu (FZA) – Allgäu Research Centre coordinates research and collaborations at the university of applied sciences – on an interdisciplinary basis across the faculties. The remits of the numerous research and development projects – whether publicly funded research programmes or serving industry and the private sector – tackle the most cutting-edge challenges in society in the fields of energy, mobility, manufacturing and social innovation.

The following institutes conduct research under the mantle of the Allgäu Research Centre at various sites throughout the region with the aim of targeting the support offered to local businesses in the form of application-focused research: 

 BZPD – Bavarian Centre for Digital Health and Social Care
 ECC-ProBell® – European Competence Centre for Bells
 EPT – Institute for Efficient Production Technology
 IDF – Institute for Data-optimised Manufacturing
 IDT – Institute for Digital Transformation in Work, Education and Society
 IEAT – Institute for Energy and Drive Technology
 IEES – Institute for Electrical Energy Systems
 IFA – Institute for Innovative Automotive Drives
 IFI – Institute for Internationalisation
 IFM – Institute for Advanced Driver Assistance Systems and Networked Mobility
 IGG – Institute for Health and Generations
 ILE – Institute for Power Electronics
 INIT – Institute for Sustainable and Innovative Development of Tourism
 IPI – Institute for Production and Informatics
 KLEVERTEC – Competence Centre for Applied Research in Food and Packaging Technology

References

External links

 Hochschulzentrum Vöhlinschloss

Hochschule für angewandte Wissenschaften Kempten 

Kempten im Allgau
Kempten
Universities and colleges in Bavaria
1977 establishments in Germany
Educational institutions established in 1977